Linda Christensen is believed to be the only butter carver in the United States who works with live models. She is known for carving the likeness of Princess Kay of the Milky Way along with the 11 Princess Kay finalists out of 90-pound blocks of butter at the annual Minnesota State Fair.  
Each year, her work draws hundreds of thousands of visitors to the Dairy Building, where the Midwest Dairy Association sponsors the butter carving in front of fair goers. The newly crowned Princess Kay and 11 finalists each spend about six hours with Christensen in the rotating 40-degree butter booth, as Christensen carves their likenesses out of butter. Princess Kay sits in the booth on the first day of the fair while the 11 finalists get their likenesses carved over the remaining days of the state fair.

Christensen carves these sculptures out of Grade A salted butter provided by AMPI (Associated Milk Producers Inc.), in New Ulm, Minnesota.  In 2011, she celebrated 40 years working with Midwest Dairy Association as a butter sculptor. Estimations show that she has carved more than 450 sculptures and 32,000 pounds of butter.   Since she has started, the butter sculptures have gone from an oddity to something identified with Minnesota.  Butter sculpting at the State Fair was originally initiated to highlight Minnesota's claim as the "butter capital of the nation." In addition to Princess Kay and the finalists, Christensen has sculpted the likenesses of celebrities from David Letterman to former Minnesota First Lady Mary Pawlenty. She even sculpted Conan O'Brien out of white chocolate and used bacon for the hair.  One of her commissions was to carve Sesame Street character Big Bird out of a 300-pound block of butter.  National Geographic has twice featured her work, and she has turned down requests from Oprah Winfrey and Johnny Carson, who wanted her to rush her carvings in one hour.

Minnesota State Fair

Running since 1859, the Minnesota State Fair is one of the largest fairs in the United States that is second only to Texas. It runs for 12 days starting sometime during the end of August and ends on Labor Day which is the first Monday of September. It takes place in Falcon Heights, Minnesota which borders the Twin Cities of Minneapolis and St. Paul. Christensen arrives just after dawn ever yday at the state fairgrounds wearing long underwear, rubber gloves with a non-porous yellow rain coat over layers of clothing, and woolen socks with crocs. Her routine is to walk the fairgrounds to get herself excited for the day. Starting between 9:00 a.m. and 9:30 a.m., Christensen spends most of her day at the State Fair with the dairy royalty in the 40-degree "butter booth," a rotating walk-in, glass-walled refrigerator. Depending on the princesses’ hair, the carving of the butter sculpture takes six to eight hours per finalist.  Christensen said that straight hair is easier than curly hair and short hair is easier than the long. She takes breaks after 90 minutes to warm up her hands, eat greasy fair food, and visit with fair goers. The most difficult part about each sculpture is getting the smile of the princess perfect.  The rest of the sculpture she said in an interview with Minnesota Original comes naturally.

The butter carving booth is one of the most popular exhibits at the state fair. The princess's family and friends stand around the rotating cooler as Christensen carves her sculpture. While she carves their faces, the princesses hold a microphone and answers question from the public about life on a dairy farm. In between interviews, Christensen talks to the princesses about boys, her children and her grandchildren.  She likes working with butter as a medium because it's forgiving and can be "squished" into any form. It's also an attractive, eye-catching surface. She said the salted butter is much nicer to carve than the unsalted butter. Freezing the butter before carving leaves the image looking flaky.  She uses a number of tools to mold and shape the butter, such as a long sharp floss-like cord, a number of knives and a 5-gallon pail to put the scraps in for the princesses to take home. She said in one of her interviews with The Wall Street Journal that this job was too big for a butter knife. She uses a similar style to Michelangelo who chipped away at his images.  She plans to continue the butter sculpting at the Minnesota State Fair until she is no longer able to use her fingers. Christensen's legacy helped lead to the creation of the Butter-fy Yourself Facebook App in 2010. The app transforms a simple Facebook profile photo into one of six butter personalities, including a dairy princess, a butter hippie, a butter cow, a butter liberty, butter bouffant and butter up, a baseball player.

Awards
To mark her 40th anniversary, the Midwest Dairy Association granted a $1,000 scholarship in Christensen's name to the Minneapolis College of Art and Design, to commemorate her dedication to carving butter heads.  It was not until 2011 that Christensen went to a dairy farm. The 2007 Princess Kay of the Milky Way, Ann Miron Tauzell hosted a party on her father's farm in honor of Christensen's 40 years. Christensen toured the AMPI butter-producing operation in New Ulm, Minnesota, the state's largest butter factory, that hand packs the butter blocks she's used all those years. According to the Star Tribune, Christensen is considered a celebrity among the dairy industry. "Growing up on a dairy farm is not exactly glamorous," said Christa Mounts Schlosser, now a dairy inspector for the state. "It's smelly and dirty. But for one day when you're spinning in that booth with Linda, you're on a pedestal."''

Early life 
Christensen was born in northeast Minneapolis as Linda Olson and spent some time growing up in Wilmar, Minnesota when her father sold Wonder Bread. Her mother worked as a secretary and her father was an aluminum siding salesman. In 1950, at 8 years-old she attended her first Minnesota State Fair. She hasn't missed a fair since.  Although spending most of her senior year in a hospital, she graduated from Richfield High School in 1960. She was married to Earl Christensen and had two daughters before enrolling at the Minneapolis College of Art and Design, in Minneapolis, Minnesota. She was one of the first married women with children to enroll there. She received a degree in visual arts with a concentration in sculptures.  In 1968, as an art student, she walked into the Dairy Building at the Minnesota State Fair on a hot day and marveled at the artist in the cooler sculpting butter heads as dairy princesses modeled, wishing she could be in the cooler too.

She was recommended for the job in 1972 when a woman from her college contacted her to fill the void of the original butter sculptor who was moving.  Her audition for the job was to work on a 55-pound block of butter for three hours. 
In 1985 Earl and Linda divorced. She worked as a middle-school art teacher in Twin Cities’ schools and later at General Mills.  For a while, she lived and owned a sculpture studio and gift shop in Danbury, in north Wisconsin. There she made ceramic wildlife sculptures for her gift shop.  More than 20 years ago, she created her own line of greeting cards, known as the “Elderberries” which conveys gentle humor about aging.  She has taught calligraphy, sculpture and drawing. In 2000, she received a master's degree in theology from the University of St. Catherine in St. Paul, Minnesota.  She took poetry classes at the Loft Literary Center in Minneapolis and continues to write and study for an online group. She also attended workshops to become a Zumba fitness instructor. She took classes in kinesiology, the study of human movement, to teach specialized classes. These are for older athletes, a special fitness level or classes for medical related issues.

Life in the off season 
Christensen currently resides in Oceanside, California, north of San Diego and works as a wine adviser. She now crafts necklaces and bracelets out of hand-tooled leather.

References 

 Featured on the PBS program "MN Original" from the TPT St. Paul, MN Station:

Artists from Minneapolis
Year of birth missing (living people)
Living people
Sculptors from Minnesota